A herring buss was a type of seagoing fishing vessel, mostly used by Dutch and Flemish herring fishermen in the 15th through early 19th centuries.

The buss ship type has a long history. It was already known around the time of the Crusades in the Mediterranean as a cargo vessel (called buzza, bucia or bucius), and we see it around 1000 AD as a more robust development of the Viking longship in Scandinavia, known as a bǘza. The Dutch Buis was probably developed from this Scandinavian ship type.

The Buis was first adapted for use as a fishing vessel in the Netherlands, after the invention of gibbing made it possible to preserve herring at sea. This made longer voyages feasible, and hence enabled Dutch fishermen to follow the herring shoals far from the coasts. The first herring buss was probably built in Hoorn around 1415. The last one was built in Vlaardingen in 1841.

Construction

The wooden ship was about 20 meters in length and displaced between 60 and 100 tons. The ratio of length to beam was between 2.5:1 and 4.5:1, which made for a relatively nimble ship, though still sufficiently stable to be seaworthy. It was a round-bilged keel ship with a round bow and stern, the latter relatively high, and with a gallery. The broad deck provided space to process the catch on board.

The ship had two or three masts. The mainmast and foremast (if present) could be lowered during fishing, leaving only the mizzen mast upright. It was square rigged on the main mast, with a gaff rig on the mizzen. It had a long bow sprit with jibboom and up to three headsails. The main course and topsail  could be reefed.

Herring fleets

The ships sailed in large fleets of 400 to 500 ships  to the fishing grounds at the Dogger Bank and the Shetland isles. They were usually escorted by naval vessels, because the English looked askance at what they considered "poaching" in waters they claimed, and were prone to arrest unescorted Dutch fishing vessels. In wartime the risk of fishing vessels being taken by privateers was also large.

The fleet would stay at sea for weeks at a time. The catch would sometimes be brought home by special ships (called ventjagers) while the fleet would still be at sea (the picture at the top shows a ventjager in the distance).

The busses used long drift nets to catch the herring. Such nets hang like curtains across the travel paths of the herring schools. The fish would catch with their gills behind the meshes of the net (which is therefore a type of gillnet). The nets would be taken aboard at night and then the crews of eighteen to thirty men would start the gibbing, salting and barrelling immediately.

There would be three to four voyages per season (depending on the weather and the catch). In the off-season the busses were used as normal cargo vessels, for instance to transport grain from the Baltic, or salt from Portugal. This multi-mode business model made the Great Fishery (as the herring fishery was called) especially profitable, as there was  far less downtime than with exclusive use as fishing vessel.

A contemporary (1614) English account illustrates the efficiency and profitability of the business:

The same author (Tobias Gentleman) in 1614 estimated the cost of fitting out a Dutch herring buss for three voyages (four months) in Summer (including wages for the crew at £88, barrels for 100 last of herring at £78, beer at £42, bread at £21, butter and bacon at £18, peas at £3, billet at £3, and wear and tear on ship and nets at £100) at £435. One hundred last of herring (at £10) would bring £1000 in his opinion, for a clear profit of £565. In his pamphlet (in which he holds up the Dutch fisheries for English emulation) he states that at the end of May a fleet of  a thousand busses would sail, with 20,000 sailors aboard. They would sail to Shetland, but wait till after 14 June (herring being unfit for consumption before that) before starting to follow the shoals. He estimates the value of the catch at more than a million pounds sterling. This illustrates how important the herring fisheries were in bringing about the Dutch Golden Age.

Gallery

See also
 Dogger (boat)

Notes

Sources
 (German)  (1987), Lexikon der Segelschiffstypen. Gräfelfing (Urbes), 
 (German) "Büse", in:  (1995)  Das große Buch der Schiffstypen. Schiffe, Boote, Flöße unter Riemen und Segel, Dampfschiffe, Motorschiffe, Meerestechnik, Augsburg
  (1978), Dutch Shipbuilding Before 1800, Amsterdam
 , "The European Fisheries in Early Modern History", in:  (1977), Cambridge Economic History of Europe, Vol. 5. The Economic Organization of Early Modern Europe, Cambridge
 (1997), The First Modern Economy. Success, Failure, and Perseverance of the Dutch Economy, 1500-1815, Cambridge University Press,

External links
 (Dutch) Fishing vessels
 B. Poulsen, Sources for Dutch herring fishery in the North Sea (1600-1850)

Sailing ships
Types of fishing vessels
Ship designs of the Dutch Republic
Dutch inventions
Tall ships